Events from the year 1876 in Ireland.

Events
1 April – Great Northern Railway (Ireland) formed by a merger of the Irish North Western Railway, Northern Railway of Ireland and the Ulster Railway.

Arts and literature

March – George Bernard Shaw moves permanently from Dublin to England.
Earliest published version of the song "Molly Malone", in Boston, Massachusetts.
Song "Rose of Killarney" composed by John Rogers Thomas in the United States.

Sport

Births
5 January – Lucien Bull, pioneer in chronophotography (died 1972 in France).
21 January
James Charles Brady, Canadian politician (died 1962 in Canada).
James Larkin, trade union leader, socialist and Irish Labour Party TD, in Liverpool (died 1947).
25 February – Philip Graves, journalist and writer (died 1953).
11 April – Paul Henry, artist (died 1958).
3 August – Sep Lambert, cricketer (died 1959).
22 October – Feardorcha Ó Conaill, Gaelic scholar (died 1929)
Full date unknown
Cissie Cahalan,  trade unionist, feminist and suffragette (died 1948).
George Townshend, writer, clergyman and Baháʼí (died 1957).
Frederick James Walker, motor cycle racer (killed at 1914 Isle of Man TT races).
Gladys Wynne, landscape painter (died 1968).

Deaths
15 February – Daniel Pollen, politician, ninth Premier of New Zealand (born 1813).
19 April – William Wilde, surgeon, author and father of Oscar Wilde (born 1815).
7 May – Joseph Philip Ronayne, civil engineer (born 1822).
16 June – Sir Henry Thomas, police magistrate in London (born 1807).
25 June – Myles Keogh, officer in American Civil War, later in U.S. 7th Cavalry Regiment, killed at the Battle of the Little Bighorn (born 1840).
14 July – James Henry, physician, classical scholar and poet (born 1798).

References

 
1870s in Ireland
Ireland
Years of the 19th century in Ireland
 Ireland